Andrew Barden is a male former international table tennis player from England.

Table tennis career
He represented England at the 1977 World Table Tennis Championships in the Swaythling Cup (men's team event) with Paul Day, Desmond Douglas and Denis Neale.

He won two English National Table Tennis Championships titles.

See also
 List of England players at the World Team Table Tennis Championships

References

Living people
Year of birth missing (living people)
English male table tennis players